Majora (Majora - Mário J. Oliveira & Irmão, Lda) is a Portuguese toy manufacturer based in Porto. It has its own museum, with toys more than 70 years old.

History
Majora was founded in 1939 by Mário J. Oliveira. In 1967 today's factory in Oporto was built. In that same year, mass production by Majora started improving and increasing in quantity.

The company produced various types of toys, in particular board games.

Products 
Majora makes over 300 types of toys today and more than 1 million toys per year. It exports to various countries in Europe.

See also
List of companies of Portugal

References

External links
  (in Portuguese)

Companies based in Porto
Toy companies of Portugal
Portuguese brands
Portuguese companies established in 1939
Toy companies established in 1939